The spectacled hooded snake (Suta spectabilis), also known commonly as the Port Lincoln snake, is a species of venomous snake in the family Elapidae. The species is native to central-southern Australia. There are three recognized subspecies.

Geographic range
S. spectabilis is found in the Australian states of New South Wales, Queensland, South Australia and Western Australia.

Habitat
The preferred natural habitats of S. spectabilis are grassland and shrubland.

Description

Reproduction
S. spectabilis is viviparous.

Subspecies
Including the nominotypical subspecies, three subspecies are recognized as being valid.
Suta spectabilis bushi 
Suta spectabilis nullarbor 
Suta spectabilis spectabilis 

Nota bene: A trinomial authority in parentheses indicates that the subspecies was originally described in a genus other than Parasuta.

Etymology
The subspecific name, bushi, is in honor of Australian herpetologist Brian Gordon Bush (born 1947).

References

Further reading
Cogger HG (2014). Reptiles and Amphibians of Australia, Seventh Edition. Clayton, Victoria, Australia: CSIRO Publishing. xxx + 1,033 pp. .
Krefft G (1869). The Snakes of Australia; an Illustrative and Descriptive Catalogue of All the Known Species. Sydney: Thomas Richards, Government Printer. xxv + 100 pp. + Plates I-XII. (Hoplocephalus spectabilis, new species, p. 61 + Plate XII, figure 4).
Storr GM (1981). "The Denisonia gouldii species-group (Serpentes, Elapidae) in Western Australia". Records of the Western Australian Museum 8 (4): 501–515. (Denisonia spectabilis nullarbor, new subspecies, pp. 512–513, Figure 6).
Storr GM (1988). "A new Rhinoplocephalus (Serpentes: Elapidae) from Western Australia". Rec. Western Australian Mus. 14 (1): 137–138. (Rhinoplocephalus spectabilis bushi, new subspecies).
Wilson, Steve; Swan, Gerry (2013). A Complete Guide to Reptiles of Australia, Fourth Edition. Sydney: New Holland Publishers. 522 pp. .

Snakes of Australia
Suta
Reptiles described in 1869
Taxobox binomials not recognized by IUCN